Majhakot may refer to:

Majhakot, Gandaki, Nepal
Majhakot, Rapti, Nepal